Franck Olivier Madou (born 15 September 1987) is an Ivorian professional footballer who last played for AZAL PFK in the Azerbaijan Premier League.

Early life
Born in Marcory, Madou moved with his parents to France when he was eighteen months old.

Career
Madou joined FC Toulouse in 2005. He was called in the reserve team and played his first professional league matches in the Championnat de France amateur.

In January 2006, Madou left Toulouse and signed his first professional contract for BSC Young Boys. He played only ten games, scoring one goal, and he left Young Boys on loan to Grasshopper Club Zürich in February 2008. After spending three months on loan at Grasshoppers, he moved to FC Biel-Bienne in the summer of 2008. Finally, he signed for Cypriot side APOP Kinyras.

In February 2017, Madou signed for AZAL PFK of the Azerbaijan Premier League.

Personal life
Madou holds a French passport.

References

1987 births
Living people
Footballers from Abidjan
Association football forwards
Ivorian footballers
French footballers
French sportspeople of Ivorian descent
Ivorian expatriate footballers
FC Martigues players
FC Biel-Bienne players
Ivorian expatriate sportspeople in France
Toulouse FC players
Expatriate footballers in Switzerland
French expatriate sportspeople in Switzerland
Ivorian expatriate sportspeople in Switzerland
French expatriate sportspeople in Azerbaijan
Swiss Super League players
Swiss Challenge League players
Ukrainian Premier League players
Cypriot First Division players
Grasshopper Club Zürich players
BSC Young Boys players
FC Lausanne-Sport players
Expatriate footballers in Cyprus
APOP Kinyras FC players
Expatriate footballers in Ukraine
Ivorian expatriate sportspeople in Ukraine
FC Zorya Luhansk players
PFC Minyor Pernik players
First Professional Football League (Bulgaria) players
Expatriate footballers in Bulgaria